Fiona Stuart Simpson (born 18 April 1965 in Sea Lake, Victoria) is an Australian politician serving as Liberal National Party (LNP) member of the Queensland Legislative Assembly, representing Maroochydore since 1992. Simpson served as Speaker of the Legislative Assembly of Queensland from 2012 to 2015 and further served as the Deputy Leader of the Queensland National Party and Deputy Leader of the Opposition from 2006 to 2008. Simpson is currently the Shadow Minister for Finance and Better Regulation and Shadow Minister for Integrity in Government.

Education
Simpson holds a Bachelor of Arts degree in Japanese, Journalism and Government and a Masters of Organisational Leadership. She also has completed the Australian Institute of Company Directors Diploma and an executive leadership course at John F Kennedy School of Government, Harvard. She was a Rotary Exchange Student to Japan, and prior to that attended Nambour State High School.

Pre-Parliamentary career
Simpson was an accomplished journalist prior to entering Parliament, winning the prestigious Dalgety Excellence in Rural Journalism Award in 1989, for the State of Queensland.

Political career
Fiona Simpson is the longest-serving woman in the LNP party room and following the 2015 election, one of the longest-serving Members of Parliament. When she won the newly created Sunshine Coast seat of Maroochydore in 1992, she was the youngest woman ever to be elected to Legislative Assembly.

Simpson has had shadow ministerial responsibility for Health, Transport, Main Roads, Tourism, Women, Communities, Housing and Waste Watch, in addition to having been elected Deputy Leader of the Queensland National Party (and therefore Deputy Leader of the Opposition) on 18 September 2006. While Deputy Leader, Simpson was a key player in the merger with the Queensland Liberal Party, which created the Liberal National Party of Queensland. She voluntarily stepped aside as Deputy Opposition Leader in favour of Liberal Party Leader Mark McArdle to help facilitate the merger.

Following the LNP's win at the 2012 election, Premier Campbell Newman announced she would be nominated for Speaker. She was elected the body's first female speaker on 15 May 2012.

The end of Simpson's tenure as Speaker was signaled with the LNP's defeat at the 2015 Queensland state election. She unsuccessfully contested the LNP leadership and was subsequently appointed as Shadow Minister for Local Government, Main Roads, Community Recovery and Resilience.

Fiona is currently the Shadow Minister for Intergity in Government, State Development, Infrastructure and Planning.

Speakership
Simpson was the first female Speaker of the Queensland Parliament's 150-year existence. Simpson had previously spoken of the need to be proactive in encouraging women to stand for Parliament and other positions of leadership. Following her appointment, Simpson continued to encourage women to consider leadership. As Speaker, Simpson initiated the Queensland Inspiring Women Awards, for Members of Parliament to nominate women in their electorate and these awards had bipartisan support.

As Speaker, Simpson formally entered into a Parliamentary Partnership Agreement on 25 September 2013 between the Queensland Parliament and the National Parliament of Papua New Guinea to promote shared understanding and stronger Parliaments. This partnership was in addition to the Parliamentary Twinning relationship with the Parliament of Vanuatu.

Past Controversy
During a parliamentary debate in 2002 on changes to anti-discrimination laws that would prevent faith-based schools from discriminating against teachers not of their faith, including gay and lesbian teachers, Simpson referred to acquaintances who are 'former' homosexuals.  Simpson also said that she had previously interviewed Sy Rogers, Sy Rogers a leader in ministering to 'former' homosexuals within the controversial ex-gay movement, specifically from Exodus International. In her speech to Parliament, Simpson contrasted what she called "some very genuinely held beliefs" that homosexuality is an unchangeable, born trait with those who believe that homosexuality is a "lifestyle choice", such that homosexuals may choose to "grow into heterosexuality over time".
 		 	
Media attention was brought to these comments in 2011, and despite the comments drawing criticism from Karen Struthers, mental health psychologist Paul Martin and the gay community, neither Simpson nor the LNP have responded to questions to clarify her personal beliefs on the subject of the ex-gay movement. Fiona Simpson deleted her Facebook page following the controversy after it was inundated with criticism over her support of Exodus.

Contacted in 2015 about the 2002 comments, Simpson provided clarifying remarks, saying "I understand that there are people who have been hurt by (these comments and) their reporting and that deeply saddens me. When I made those comments in 2002 I was sharing a friend’s personal story. I believe equally that every person has the right to have their story heard and that every person is valuable and deserving of respect. I appreciate that different people will have different stories and our community is more welcoming when we listen more carefully and speak more compassionately".

References

https://en.wikipedia.org/wiki/Sy_Rogers

External links
 Official Biography
 Personal Website
 Maiden Speech

1965 births
Living people
Australian monarchists
National Party of Australia members of the Parliament of Queensland
Liberal National Party of Queensland politicians
Members of the Queensland Legislative Assembly
Speakers of the Queensland Legislative Assembly
21st-century Australian politicians
21st-century Australian women politicians
Women members of the Queensland Legislative Assembly